Castillos is a small city in the Rocha Department of southeastern Uruguay.

Geography
Other settlements in the area include Barrio Torres, about one kilometre southeast of Castillo, La Esmeralda, several kilometres to the northeast and Aguas Dulces several kilometres to the southeast along the Route 16.

Castillo is located in the eastern part of the department of Rocha. The land is low lying, located not far from the coast, with an average altitude of 44 metres. Laguna de Castillos is located to the southwest of the city, while north of it is the Cerro de los Rocha.

History
It was founded on 19 April 1866 under the name "San Vicente de Castillos", derived from the chapel San Vicente Mártir de Castillos. On 3 May 1909, its status was elevated to "Villa" (town) by decree Ley N° 3.453, and on 3 November 1952, to "Ciudad" (city) by decree  Ley N° 11.875.

Population 
In 2011 Castillos had a population of 7,541.
 
Source: Instituto Nacional de Estadística de Uruguay

Landmarks
The main plaza of the town is called Plaza Artigas and there is a cemetery in the southeast of town near the junction of Routes 9 and 16. Most of the streets are named after prominent dates in Uruguayan history and heroic figures, e.g. 25 de Mayo and General Rivera.

Government
As of 2011, the local mayor is Raúl Servetto.

Places of worship
 Parish Church of Mary Help of Christians and St. Vincent Martyr (Roman Catholic)

Notable people 
 Irineu Riet Correa, politician
 Nelson "Pindingo" Pereyra, musician
 Jesús Perdomo, historian

References

External links
INE map of Castillos and Barrio Torres

Populated places in the Rocha Department